The National Domestic Violence Hotline (NDVH) is a 24-hour confidential service for survivors, victims and those affected by domestic violence, intimate partner violence and relationship abuse. Advocates are available at 1-800-799-SAFE (7233) and through online chatting at www.TheHotline.org. All calls are free and confidential. The NDVH was created through the Violence Against Women Act (VAWA) in the United States. The NDVH offers a variety of help options. The NDVH provides information on topics such as domestic violence, financial abuse, LGBTQ relationship abuse, domestic violence policy updates, advocate information, what to expect when calling the hotline, and life after abuse and domestic violence. The NDVH launched loveisrespect, a resource empower youth to prevent and end dating abuse and promote healthy dating relationships.

Hotline description 
The hotline is 100% confidential. Hotline operators, whom the NDVH calls advocates, are given a series of training and practice sessions prior to answering calls and are instructed to ask the caller a series of questions to ensure that the caller is safe, ascertain the situation, and then help the caller determine a course of action. The hotline is intended to be used by not only people experiencing domestic violence, but also people who feel that they are beginning to show signs of abusing their partner. The hotline advocate will help the caller by asking questions to identify red flags, and teach the caller techniques on how to calm down.

The hotline operates 24/7, is available in over 170 different languages, and is open to calls from undocumented immigrants. The NDVH's website also provides information on a variety of topics about domestic abuse, which includes the definition of abuse and its warning signs. The website also offers tips for victims and survivors, statistics and resources, as well as information on how to have healthy relationships.

Break the Cycle 
Break the Cycle is a partner of both the National Domestic Violence Hotline and Loveisrespect. Break the Cycle was founded in 1996, to help provide a resource for young people, specifically ages 12–24, experiencing dating violence. Break the Cycle provides leadership and education opportunities to teach young people about healthy relationships. Let's Be Real (LBR) is an online/offline movement for people under the age of 24 to come together and have conversations about relationships such as sexuality, break-ups, and first-time hookups.

Loveisrespect

Loveisrespect, a 24-hour national Web-based and telephone resource, was created to help teens (ages 13–18) experiencing dating abuse, and is the only helpline in the U.S. serving all 50 states, Puerto Rico and the Virgin Islands. It was launched February 8, 2007, by the National Domestic Violence Hotline and partnered with Break the Cycle in 2011. In addition to the telephone hotline there is a text feature, and a live chat option, which allows teens to connect to trained peer advocates via the web.

Dating Bill of Rights 
Featured on loveisrespect's website is the Teen Dating Bill of Rights, a set of affirmations and pledges for teens reflecting the importance of awareness of dating abuse and the need for young people to take a stand and nurture healthy relationships.

Teen Dating Bill of Rights

I have the right:
- To always be treated with respect.
- To be in a healthy relationship.
- To not be hurt physically or emotionally.
- To refuse sex or affection at anytime.
- To have friends and activities apart from my boyfriend or girlfriend.
- To end a relationship.

I pledge to:
- Always treat my boyfriend or girlfriend with respect.
- Never hurt my boyfriend or girlfriend physically, verbally, or emotionally.
- Respect my girlfriend's or boyfriend's decisions concerning sex and affection.
- Not be controlling or manipulative in my relationship.
- Accept responsibility for myself and my actions.

Domestic violence in the LGBTQ community 
The Hotline is aware that domestic violence can happen to anyone regardless of sex, gender, race, or sexual orientation. Research shows that people in LGBTQ relationships often use the same tools to gain power over their partner as in heterosexual relationships. These tactics can include using children, privilege, isolation and emotional abuse.

See also
 Domestic violence in the United States
 List of domestic violence hotlines
 National Coalition Against Domestic Violence
 Outline of domestic violence

References

External links
 National Domestic Violence Hotline 1-800-799-7233 (1-800-799-SAFE) TTY: 1-800-787-3224 
loveisrespect
 loveisrespect: National Teen Dating Abuse Helpline (archived version)
 Breakthecycle

Domestic violence-related organizations in the United States
Charities based in Texas
Dating
Crisis hotlines
Webby Award winners